Aleksandra Butvina (born 14 February 1986) is a Russian female heptathlete, which participated at the 2013 World Championships in Athletics.

International competitions

References

1986 births
Living people
Russian heptathletes
World Athletics Championships athletes for Russia
Russian Athletics Championships winners
Competitors at the 2011 Summer Universiade
21st-century Russian women